Jills veranda (Jill's veranda) is an SVT documentary series. In the programmes, Swedish female country singer Jill Johnson invites six Swedish artists to explore the town of Nashville together with her. Jill Johnson and the guest artists sing and play, explore the history of country music and encounter social issues in the USA like racism, high number of weapons, homophobia and poverty.

Recording of the first season began in Nashville during mid-2013, and broadcast began in early 2014. The programme was awarded Kristallen 2014 in the category "programme of the year" and " reality programme of the year". Jill Johnson also won in the "Female show host of the year" category.

Contributors

Season 1
22 January 2014 - Titiyo Jah
29 January 2014 - Kakan Hermansson
5 February 2014 - Rikard "Skizz" Bizzi
12 February 2014 - Marit Bergman
26 February 2014 - Kristian Gidlund
5 March 2014 - Magnus Carlson, Doug Seegers

Season 2
11 November 2015 - Seinabo Sey
18 November 2015 - Joel Alme
25 November 2015 - Veronica Maggio
2 December 2015 - Jerry Williams
9 December 2015 - Adam Baptiste
16 December 2015 - Annika Norlin

Season 3
15 November 2017 – Maxida Märak, Bill Miller
22 November 2017 – Mia Skäringer
29 November 2017 – Dregen
6 December 2017 – Lisa Nilsson
13 December 2017 – Ana Diaz
20 December 2017 – Erik Lundin

Season 4
12 February 2020 – Miriam Bryant
19 February 2020 – Mikael Wiehe
26 February 2020 – Emil Svanängen
4 March 2020 – Shima Niavarani
11 March 2020 – Amanda Werne
18 March 2020 – Mauro Scocco

2020 Special
23 July 2020 – Jill i Lilla Hult was broadcast from café Lilla Ro outside Ängelholm including Maja Francis

References

External links

Jills veranda at SVT Play 

2014 Swedish television series debuts
Culture of Nashville, Tennessee
American country music
Swedish country music